Herndon High School is a high school in Herndon, Virginia.

Herndon High School may also refer to:

Herndon High School (Kansas), in Herndon, Kansas
Herndon High School (West Virginia), in Wyoming County, West Virginia (defunct)

See also
Herndon Career Center, a school in Raytown, Missouri